The 2012–13 FK Austria Wien season is the 101 season in club history. Training has been set to start on 11 June 2012.

Review and events

Austria Wien's Board of Directors met on 21st of May 2012 to discuss Ivica Vastić future as manager and decided to sack him. The Board of Directors have decided that Franco Foda is their first choice to replace Vastić and offered Foda the position. However, Foda turned down Austria Wien's offer and accepted the position from 1. FC Kaiserslautern. On May 30th 2012, Peter Stöger became the new manager of the club. Preseason training started on 11 June 2012.

The club opened their season with a win in the Austrian Cup. Their opening fixture of the Bundesliga season was scheduled for 21 July 2012. The match was rescheduled for the following Wednesday.

Fixtures and results

Legend

Bundesliga

League results and fixtures

League table

Result summary

ÖFB-Cup

Squad

Squad and statistics

|-
! colspan="10" style="background:#dcdcdc; text-align:center;"| Goalkeepers

|-
! colspan="10" style="background:#dcdcdc; text-align:center;"| Defenders

|-
! colspan="10" style="background:#dcdcdc; text-align:center;"| Midfielders

|-
! colspan="10" style="background:#dcdcdc; text-align:center;"| Forwards

|-
! colspan="10" style="background:#dcdcdc; text-align:center;"| No longer at the club

|}

Transfers

In

Out

Notes
1. Austria Wien goals first.

Sources

Match Reports

Other

Austria Wien
2012-13 Austria Wien Season
Austrian football championship-winning seasons